Roberto Curcio (3 August 1912 – 8 April 1992) was an Italian modern pentathlete. He competed at the 1948 Summer Olympics.

References

External links
 

1912 births
1992 deaths
Italian male modern pentathletes
Olympic modern pentathletes of Italy
Modern pentathletes at the 1948 Summer Olympics
Sportspeople from Alexandria
20th-century Italian people